Čanaklija is a village in the municipality of Vasilevo, North Macedonia.

Demographics
According to the 2002 census, the village had a total of 598 inhabitants. Ethnic groups in the village include:

Macedonians 554
Turks 41
Others 3

References

Villages in Vasilevo Municipality